Opalia  is a genus of small sea snails, marine gastropod mollusks in the family Epitoniidae, commonly known as wentletraps.

Species
According to the World Register of Marine Species (WoRMS), the following species with a valid name are included  within the genus Opalia  :

 Opalia abbotti Clench & Turner, 1952 (after R. Tucker Abbott)
 Opalia aglaia (Bartsch, 1915) (synonym of Gibbula agalia Bartsch, 1915)
 Opalia ahiparana (A. W. B. Powell, 1930)
 Opalia alba (de Boury, 1911)
 Opalia apostolorum (Iredale, 1936)
 Opalia attenuata (Pease, 1860)
 Opalia aurifila (Dall, 1889)
 Opalia australis (Lamarck, 1822)
 Opalia bairdii (E.A. Smith, 1872)
 Opalia ballinensis (E. A. Smith, 1891)
 Opalia bardeyi (Jousseaume, 1912)
 † Opalia basicarinata Lozouet, 1999 
 Opalia bicarinata (G. B. Sowerby II, 1844)
 † Opalia billaudeli (Mayer, 1864) 
 Opalia burchorum DuShane, 1988
 Opalia burryi Clench & Turner, 1950
 Opalia calyx Nakayama, 2012
 Opalia candida T. Cossignani, 2020
 Opalia colimana Hertlein & Strong, 1951
 Opalia corolla (Melvill & Standen, 1903)
 Opalia coronata (Philippi, 1844)
 Opalia crassilabrum (G.B. Sowerby II, 1844)
 Opalia crenata (Linnaeus, 1758)
 Opalia crenatoides Carpenter, 1864
 Opalia crystallina (Carpenter, 1864)
 Opalia diadema (G. B. Sowerby I, 1832)
 Opalia dushaneae Garcia, 2004
 Opalia eolis Clench & Turner, 1950
 Opalia exopleura (Dall, 1917)
 Opalia felderi Garcia, 2004
 † Opalia flemingi Beu, 2011 
 Opalia fortunata Bouchet & Warén, 1986
 Opalia funiculata (Carpenter, 1857)
 Opalia gaini Lamy, 1922
 Opalia garciai Kilburn, 1994
 Opalia gereti (de Boury, 1913)
 Opalia granosa (Quoy & Gaimard, 1834)
 Opalia granulosa de Boury, 1909
 Opalia gruveli (de Boury) (temporary name)
 Opalia hellenica (Forbes, 1844)
 Opalia hidryma (Melvill, 1899)
 Opalia hotessieriana (d’Orbigny, 1842)
 Opalia infrequens (C. B. Adams, 1852)
 † Opalia komitica (Laws, 1944) 
 Opalia japonica (Okutani, 1964)
 Opalia koskinum (Hedley, 1909)
 Opalia leeana (A. E. Verrill, 1882)
 Opalia levis Nakayama, 2010 
 Opalia longissima Garcia, 2004
 Opalia lorenzi T. Cossignani, 2020
 † Opalia mackayi P. A. Maxwell, 1992 
 Opalia mammosa (Melvill & Standen, 1903)
 Opalia martis (Thiele, 1925)
 Opalia matajiroi (Kuroda, 1954)
 Opalia mauritanica Talavera, 1975
 Opalia megalodon Garcia, 2004
 Opalia methoria Kilburn, 1985
 Opalia mexicana Dall, 1908
 Opalia minervae (Thiele, 1925)
 Opalia monovaricosa (Kuroda & Habe, 1961)
 Opalia montereyensis (Dall, 1907)
 Opalia morchiana (Dall, 1889)
 Opalia mormulaeformis (Masahito, Kuroda & Habe, 1971)
 Opalia neocaledonica Garcia, 2004
 † Opalia nympha (Hutton, 1885) 
 Opalia pacoi Engl, 2002
 Opalia paucisculpta Bozzetti, 2007
 Opalia paulula DuShane, 1974
 † Opalia peyrerensis Lozouet, 1999 
 Opalia pseudoescalaris (Melvill & Standen, 1901)
 Opalia pumilio (Libassi, 1859)
 Opalia punctata (Thiele, 1925)
 Opalia pupipunctata (de Boury, 1911)
 Opalia revizee Lima & Christoffersen, 2014
 Opalia sanjuanensis (Lowe, 1932)
 Opalia soror (Odhner, 1919)
 Opalia spongiosa Carpenter, 1866
 Opalia subcrassa (Cotton & Godfrey, 1938)
 Opalia sumatrensis (Thiele, 1925)
  † Opalia tenuispiralis (P. Marshall, 1919)
 Opalia texta (E. A. Smith, 1903)
 Opalia thorsenae Garcia, 2004
 Opalia tortipunctata Weil, L. Brown & Neville, 1999
 Opalia turnerae Garcia, 2004
 Opalia velumnuptialis Garcia, 2004
 † Opalia waikakahiensis (P. A. Maxwell, 1992) 
 Opalia wareni Garcia, 2004
 Opalia wroblewskyi (Mörch, 1875)
 Opalia zelandica Finlay, 1930

Species brought into synonymy
 Opalia andrewsii (A. E. Verrill, 1882): synonym of Cylindriscala andrewsii (A. E. Verrill, 1882)
 Opalia antarctica (E. A. Smith, 1907): synonym of Acirsa antarctica (E. A. Smith, 1907)
 Opalia barbadensis (de Boury, 1913): synonym of Opalia pumilio var. morchiana (Dall, 1889): synonym of Opalia morchiana (Dall, 1889)
 Opalia borealis Keep, 1881: synonym of Opalia wroblewskyi (Mörch, 1875)
 Opalia bullata Carpenter, 1864: synonym of Opalia infrequens (C. B. Adams, 1852)
 Opalia cerigottana Sturany, 1896: synonym of Punctiscala cerigottana (Sturany, 1896)
 Opalia chacei Strong, 1937: synonym of Opalia wroblewskyi (Mörch, 1875)
 Opalia consors (Crosse & P. Fischer, 1864): synonym of Gyroscala lamellosa (Lamarck, 1822)
 Opalia coronata (Scacchi, 1844): synonym of Opalia hellenica (Forbes, 1844)
 Opalia corsicana Nordsieck, 1974: synonym of Acirsa subdecussata (Cantraine, 1835)
 Opalia crenulata (Kiener, 1839): synonym of Opalia crenata (Linnaeus, 1758)
 Opalia dromio Dall, 1927: synonym of Opaliopsis opalina (Dall, 1927)
 Opalia espirita (Baker, Hanna & Strong, 1930): synonym of Opalia crystallina (Carpenter, 1864)
 Opalia evicta (de Boury, 1919): synonym of Opalia montereyensis (Dall, 1907)
 Opalia fregata (Iredale, 1936): synonym of Cirsotrema fregata (Iredale, 1936)
 Opalia fusoides (Jousseaume, 1912): synonym of Opalia bicarinata (G. B. Sowerby II, 1844)
 Opalia fusticulus Gaglini, 1992: synonym of Opalia abbotti Clench & Turner, 1952
 Opalia gracilis (Masahito, Kuroda & Habe, 1971): synonym of Opalia bicarinata (G. B. Sowerby II, 1844)
 Opalia grossicostata (Nyst, 1871): synonym of Opalia hotessieriana (d'Orbigny, 1842)
 Opalia humerosa (Schepman, 1909): synonym of Cylindriscala humerosa (Schepman, 1909)
 Opalia insculpta Carpenter, 1865: synonym of Opalia crenatoides Carpenter, 1864
 Opalia japonica (Okutani, 1964): synonym of Papuliscala japonica (Okutani, 1964)
 Opalia linteata (Schwengel, 1943): synonym of Opalia pumilio (Mörch, 1875)
 Opalia magellanica (Philippi, 1845): synonym of Epitonium magellanicum (Philippi, 1845)
 Opalia maxwelli (Finlay, 1930): synonym of Funiscala maxwelli Finlay, 1930
 Opalia mazatlanica Dall, 1908: synonym of Opalia infrequens (C. B. Adams, 1852)
 Opalia nicolayi Nordsieck, 1974: synonym of Opalia abbotti Clench & Turner, 1952
 Opalia nodosocarinata (Dall, 1889): synonym of Opalia pumilio (Mörch, 1875)
 † Opalia plicosa (Philippi, 1844) : synonym of  † Punctiscala plicosa (Philippi, 1844)
 Opalia pluricostata Dall, 1917: synonym of Opalia montereyensis (Dall, 1907)
 Opalia retiporosa (Carpenter, 1866): synonym of Opalia spongiosa Carpenter, 1864
 Opalia revizee Lima, Christoffersen, Barros & Folly, 2012: synonym of Opalia revizee Lima & Christoffersen, 2014
 Opalia terebralioides Kilburn, 1975: synonym of Claviscala terebralioides (Kilburn, 1975)
 Opalia tortilis (Watson, 1883): synonym of Cylindriscala tortilis (Watson, 1883)
 Opalia torulosa (Brocchi, 1814): synonym of Claviscala richardi (Dautzenberg & de Boury, 1897)
 Opalia tremperi Bartsch, 1927: synonym of Opalia infrequens (C. B. Adams, 1852)
 Opalia valida (Verco, 1906): synonym of Cirsotrema validum (Verco, 1906)

References

 Gofas, S.; Le Renard, J.; Bouchet, P. (2001). Mollusca, in: Costello, M.J. et al. (Ed.) (2001). European register of marine species: a check-list of the marine species in Europe and a bibliography of guides to their identification. Collection Patrimoines Naturels, 50: pp. 180–213
 Spencer, H.G., Marshall, B.A. & Willan, R.C. (2009). Checklist of New Zealand living Mollusca. Pp 196-219. in: Gordon, D.P. (ed.) New Zealand inventory of biodiversity. Volume one. Kingdom Animalia: Radiata, Lophotrochozoa, Deuterostomia. Canterbury University Press, Christchurch

External links
 Boury E. de (1886) Monographie des Scalidae vivants et fossiles. Partie I: Sous genre Crisposcala. Paris, Comptoir Géologique de Paris, pp. i-xlv, 1-52, pl. 1-6
 Boury E. (de) (1909). Catalogue des sous-genres de Scalidae. Journal de Conchyliologie, 57: 255-258
 Kilburn R.N. (1985). The family Epitoniidae (Mollusca: Gastropoda) in southern Africa and Mozambique. Annals of the Natal Museum. 27(1): 239-337

Epitoniidae
Gastropod genera